The action of 12 July 1564 was an engagement between naval forces of Denmark-Norway and Sweden during the Northern Seven Years' War.

This battle took place on 12 July 1564 near Warnemünde, when the Danish ships Byens Løffue 56, Morian 47, and David 42 defeated the Swedish ship Hvita Falk, under Captain Björnson, after several hours of fighting. At about noon Björnson blew his ship up so that it wouldn't be captured, and there were only two survivors.

References

1564 in Denmark
1564
Conflicts in 1564